Adriano Facchini (6 February 1927 – 20 July 1969) was an Italian modern pentathlete. He competed at the 1956 and 1960 Summer Olympics.

References

External links
 

1927 births
1969 deaths
Italian male modern pentathletes
Olympic modern pentathletes of Italy
Modern pentathletes at the 1956 Summer Olympics
Modern pentathletes at the 1960 Summer Olympics
People from Pesaro
Sportspeople from the Province of Pesaro and Urbino
20th-century Italian people